Lanesund och Överby is a locality situated in Uddevalla Municipality, Västra Götaland County, Sweden with 347 inhabitants in 2010.

References 

Populated places in Västra Götaland County
Populated places in Uddevalla Municipality